NGC 3316 is a barred lenticular galaxy located about 190 million light-years away in the constellation Hydra. The galaxy was discovered by astronomer John Herschel on March 26, 1835. NGC 3316 is a member of the Hydra Cluster, and appears to have a small companion galaxy known as HCC 15.

See also 
 List of NGC objects (3001–4000)

References

External links

Hydra Cluster
Hydra (constellation)
Barred lenticular galaxies
3316 
031571 
Astronomical objects discovered in 1835
Discoveries by John Herschel